Lewisohn Nunatak is an isolated nunatak  southeast of the Mackay Mountains, in the Ford Ranges of Marie Byrd Land, Antarctica. It was discovered and mapped by the United States Antarctic Service (1939–41), and was named by the Advisory Committee on Antarctic Names for Walter P. Lewisohn, a radio operator with the Byrd Antarctic Expedition (1933–35).

References

Nunataks of Marie Byrd Land